Tomb Raider Reloaded is an action arcade game developed by Canadian studio Emerald City Games and published by CDE Entertainment for iOS and Android devices. Based on the Tomb Raider series, the game uses the classic character depiction of protagonist Lara Croft, departing from the "grittier" presentation of the "Survivor" reboot trilogy that began with Tomb Raider in 2013. The title was released between 2020-2022 in a few select countries as a free-to-play game, with optional in-app purchases, with a full release on 14 February 2023.

Development 
The game was announced in November 2020 for a 2021 release on iOS and Android, with Emerald City Games serving as the development studio, with it being published by Square Enix London Mobile. Franchise developer Crystal Dynamics was not directly involved with the game, but provided assistance to assure a "great Tomb Raider experience". The game soft-launched in South East Asia, Thailand and the Philippines on the Google Play Store in May 2021.

On July 21, an update was released that included improved graphics, more levels, new music, bug fixes and more. The game also added a new opening cutscene featuring the voice of Keeley Hawes, who last voiced Lara Croft in Lara Croft and the Temple of Osiris.

On October 15, Square Enix London Mobile director Ed Perkins said that the game was delayed to 2022 and clarified that it was not meant to tie in directly to Square Enix's official 25th anniversary celebration of the Tomb Raider franchise in 2021. However, on the 25th anniversary of the release of Tomb Raider on the Sega Saturn in Europe on October 28, Shelley Blond, Judith Gibbins and Jonell Elliott were revealed to voice Lara Croft in Reloaded, giving players the option to choose between their voices as a launch exclusive feature.

On November 1, 2022, the game was confirmed to have been delayed once more to be released on February 14, 2023.

References

External links 
 

2023 video games
Action video games
Android (operating system) games
Free-to-play video games
IOS games
Single-player video games
Square Enix games
Reloaded
Video games developed in Canada